Mykyta Yermak (born 10 November 1993) is a Ukrainian male artistic gymnast and member of the national team. He is a silver medallist of the 2015 European Games.

Career
The most active part of Yermak's sporting career was in the period between 2013 and 2015. In the qualification at the 2013 World Championships, Yermak was 45th on parallel bars, 95th on rings and 120th on floor. The 2014 World Championships was slightly more successful for him. He finished 32nd in the qualification for the individual all-around final and was second reserve athlete for the final. At the 2014 World Championships, he finished 67th in the qualification for the individual all-around final with his best apparatus performance being 72nd on pommel horse. Ukrainian men's team did not manage to qualify for men's team final as well.

Yermak had several successes at the European and students' competitions. He won a silver medal in men's team event at the 2015 European Games. At the 2015 Summer Universiade, he won a bronze medal in the team event.

He finished 15th in men's all-around final at the 2015 European Championships.

Personal life
He graduated from the Kamyanets-Podilsky Ivan Ohienko National University.

References

External links 
 

1993 births
Living people
Ukrainian male artistic gymnasts
Gymnasts at the 2015 European Games
European Games medalists in gymnastics
European Games silver medalists for Ukraine
Universiade medalists in gymnastics
Universiade bronze medalists for Ukraine
Medalists at the 2015 Summer Universiade
21st-century Ukrainian people